Jessie Alexandra Fleming (born March 11, 1998) is a Canadian professional soccer player who plays as a midfielder for FA Women's Super League club Chelsea and the Canada national team.

Fleming previously played collegiate soccer in the United States with the UCLA Bruins from 2016 to 2019. She was a member of Canada's gold medal-winning side at the 2020 Summer Olympics, where she scored the team's only regular time goal in the final on a penalty kick, as well as the first goal in the penalty shoot-out.

Early life
Fleming was born in London, Ontario to Michaele and John Fleming, who are both originally from Toronto. She has an older brother, Tristan, and a younger sister, Elysse. Growing up, she competed in soccer, hockey (including in a full-contact boys' league), track and field, and cross-country. She started playing soccer at the age of three for the London-based Nor'West Optimist Soccer Club, where she remained until 2016.

Fleming attended Ryerson Public School for elementary school, where she remained undefeated in cross-country throughout her entire elementary school career. She went on to attend London Central Secondary School from Grade 9 to Grade 10, where she competed in OFSAA track and field and cross-country. In 2012, she won the novice girls' 4000m race at the OFSAA Cross Country Championships. The following year, she competed at the OFSAA Track and Field Championships and won both the midget women's 1500m and midget women's 3000m competitions. She still holds the record for the 1500m in the midget women's category. In 2014, she competed again at the OFSAA Track and Field Championships, winning a gold medal in the junior women's 3000m race and a silver medal in the junior women's 1500m race. She switched to H. B. Beal Secondary School for Grades 11 and 12, and graduated in 2016.

College career
Fleming verbally committed to UCLA in December 2014 and joined the Bruins in August 2016. She played her first game on August 28, less than ten days after helping Canada win a bronze medal at the Olympic Games, scoring twice in a 4–3 loss to Florida. Her goalscoring tear continued as she netted 7 goals in her first 6 games as a college player. She appeared in 19 games, making 16 starts, and finished as the leading scorer on the team with 11 goals and 5 assists, for a total of 27 points. Fleming was one of just two freshmen to receive All-America honours in 2016, being selected to the NSCAA All-America third team. She was selected the Top Drawer Soccer Freshman of the Year, and also earned first-team NSCAA All-Pacific Region, All-Pac-12 and All-Freshman acclaim.

As a sophomore, Fleming scored 6 goals, including three game-winners, and recorded 8 assists, for a total of 20 points. She earned first-team All-America honours and received first-team All-West Region and All-Pac-12 honours for the second-straight year. After helping UCLA reach the College Cup final and scoring a goal in the championship match, she was selected as a finalist for the Hermann Trophy and chosen as one of four nominees for the Class of 2018 Honda Sports Award for soccer.

Although she missed nearly half of her junior season while on national team duty, Fleming still earned first-team All-Pac-12 honours for the third year in a row and was a second-team All-West Region honouree after scoring 15 points on 5 goals and 5 assists.

As a senior, Fleming played in a defensive midfield role, finishing the season with 3 goals and 4 assists in 22 appearances, for a total of 10 points. She was chosen as one of three finalists for the Hermann Trophy and one of four finalists for the Honda Sports Award. She was also one of ten finalists for the Senior CLASS Award.

She graduated from UCLA in 2021, with a major in materials engineering and a minor in environmental science.

Club career

Chelsea
On July 22, 2020, Fleming signed for FA WSL champions Chelsea on a three-year deal. On August 29, she made her debut for the Blues as a substitute against Manchester City in the 2020 Women's FA Community Shield at Wembley. On December 9, she made her UEFA Women's Champions League debut in a 5–0 away win over Benfica. She made her first start against the same opposition a week later, and helped her team to a 3–0 victory at Kingsmeadow. On January 27, 2021, she made her first league start in a 4–0 away win over Aston Villa at Banks's Stadium. On March 14, she played the full 90 minutes as the Blues won the 2021 FA Women's League Cup Final against Bristol City at Vicarage Road. In her first season at Chelsea, she made a total of 26 appearances across all competitions and won the 2020–21 FA WSL title. She was an unused substitute in the 2021 UEFA Women's Champions League Final, where Chelsea was defeated by Barcelona. Fleming would later cite the transition to the professional scene as a challenge, in particular the need to raise her game in order to vie for playing time.

Beginning the 2021–22 FA WSL, Fleming scored her first goal for Chelsea in a 6–1 victory against Manchester United at Leigh Sports Village on September 26, 2021. Three days later, she got her first assist for the club in the 2020–21 Women's FA Cup quarter-final against Birmingham City, setting up Fran Kirby in the 72nd minute. On October 10, she registered her first league assist in a 2–0 win against Leicester City. On October 31, she assisted Bethany England in a 3–0 victory against Manchester City at the Academy Stadium, helping Chelsea reach the 2021 Women's FA Cup Final. On November 9, she scored her first Champions League goal in a 7–0 win away to Servette. The 2021–22 WSL season saw Fleming's usage by the club increase significantly, featuring in 21 of 22 games, 11 of those as starts, and tallying six goals and four assists. She won the league title with Chelsea for the second time, before playing in her second consecutive run with the club to the 2022 Women's FA Cup Final.

International career

Youth
Fleming started playing for the Canadian youth national teams in 2012, at the age of 14. The following year, she captained Canada at the 2013 CONCACAF Women's U-17 Championship in Jamaica, leading the team to a silver medal. During the tournament, she scored three goals (two in the group stage and one in the semi-final against Jamaica) and was named Player of the Match in two of Canada's five matches. As a result, she was named to the Best XI and awarded the Golden Ball as the tournament's Most Valuable Player (MVP).
In December 2013, she was chosen as one of six nominees for the Canadian U-17 Players of the Year award.

At the 2014 FIFA U-17 Women's World Cup in Costa Rica, Fleming navigated Canada out of the group of death (which included Germany, North Korea, and Ghana). She played in all four of Canada's games, scoring one goal in the 2–2 draw with Germany. She also recorded an assist in the quarter-final loss to Venezuela.

Fleming was a member of the team that reached the quarter-finals of the 2014 FIFA U-20 Women's World Cup in Canada. At 16, she was the second-youngest player on the Canadian roster. She made two appearances (against Ghana and Finland) in the group stage of the tournament, before playing all 90 minutes in the quarter-final against Germany. In December 2014, she was named Canadian U-17 Player of the Year.

Fleming also represented Canada at the 2015 Pan American Games, where the Canadian Soccer Association fielded an Olympic Developmental under-23 squad. She played every minute of the tournament, scoring an 88th-minute penalty in the bronze medal match against Mexico, which Canada lost 2–1. In December 2015, she was named Canadian U-20 Player of the Year.

Senior

2013–14: Senior debut
In December 2013, following her performances at the CONCACAF Women's U-17 Championship, Fleming received her first call-up to the senior national team, ahead of the 2013 Torneio Internacional de Brasília. On December 15, she made her senior international debut at the age of 15 years and 278 days, when she replaced Brittany Baxter in the 72nd minute of a 1–0 defeat to Chile at the Estádio Nacional Mané Garrincha. Fifteen minutes into her debut, she received her first yellow card. At the time, she was the second-youngest player to ever play for the national team; as of 2021, she is the third-youngest, after Olivia Smith and Kara Lang. A week later, she made her first start in a 1–0 win over Scotland, and was replaced at half-time by Kaylyn Kyle.

In 2014, Fleming made six more appearances – three as a starter and three as a substitute – for the senior national team, all in friendly matches.

2015–16: 2015 World Cup and 2016 Summer Olympics
In early 2015, Fleming moved to Vancouver to train full-time with the national team ahead of the 2015 FIFA Women's World Cup. In January, she started all three matches at the 2015 Four Nations Tournament in China, which Canada won. On March 4, 2015, Fleming scored her first senior international goal in a 2–0 win over Scotland at the 2015 Cyprus Cup.

On April 27, 2015, Fleming was named to the roster for the 2015 FIFA Women's World Cup; at the age of 17, she was the youngest player on the Canadian team. On May 14, she scored the only goal in a behind-closed-doors friendly against Mexico, which Canada won 1–0. On June 15, she started Canada's final group stage match of the World Cup against Netherlands in front of 45,420 fans at Olympic Stadium. The match ended 1–1, which was enough for Canada to win Group A.

At the CONCACAF Olympic Qualifiers, Fleming made three appearances in the group stage and scored her second international goal against Trinidad and Tobago on February 14, helping Canada win Group A. However, she did not feature in the semi-final win over Costa Rica or in the final loss to the United States. On July 20, she scored her third international goal in a friendly win over China at the Stade Sébastien Charléty. She was named to Canada's 2016 Summer Olympics squad, which defeated the home team Brazil to win a bronze medal. She had a secondary assist on the winning goal, scored by Christine Sinclair.

2017–19: 50 caps and 2019 World Cup
Fleming made her 50th senior appearance on March 7, 2018, scoring her fifth international goal in a 3–0 win over South Korea at the 2018 Algarve Cup.

On May 25, 2019, Fleming was named to the roster for the 2019 FIFA Women's World Cup, where she played every minute of the tournament. On June 15, she scored her first World Cup goal in the 2–0 group stage victory over New Zealand and was chosen Player of the Match.

2020–22: 2020 Summer Olympics
Fleming was named part of the Canadian team for the 2020 Summer Olympics in Tokyo, participating in her second Olympic women's tournament. In the August 2, 2021, semi-final match with the United States, she scored the only goal via a penalty kick, resulting in a 1–0 win that sent Canada to its first ever Olympic final. She repeated her performance during the gold medal match, scoring on a penalty kick against Sweden. She later scored the first goal in the shoot-out at the end of the game, which resulted in Canada winning the gold medal.

In 2021, Fleming was named Player of the Month three times by the Canadian Soccer Association, in the months of March, October, and November. She was also voted as Canadian Player of the Year and nominated for the CONCACAF Women's Player of the Year award.

At the 2022 Arnold Clark Cup, Fleming started the first match against England as captain, in the absence of regular captain Christine Sinclair. On June 26, she earned her 100th cap while serving as captain again for a 0–0 draw against South Korea in a friendly match at BMO Field. Later in the year, she was one of four players to score three goals at the 2022 CONCACAF W Championship, but lost the Golden Boot to teammate Julia Grosso on a tiebreaker, Grosso having had an assist and played fewer minutes. She was named Canada Soccer's Play of the Year for the second time, becoming the third woman to win the award consecutively.

Career statistics

Club 
.

International

International goals

Honours
Chelsea
 FA Women's Super League: 2020–21, 2021–22
 Women's FA Cup: 2020–21, 2021–22
 FA Women's League Cup: 2020–21
 Women's FA Community Shield: 2020
Canada
 Olympic gold medal: 2021
 Olympic bronze medal: 2016
 Algarve Cup: 2016
 Four Nations Tournament: 2015
Individual
 CONCACAF Best XI: 2017

CONCACAF Women's Championship Best XI: 2018, 2022
CONCACAF Women's U-17 Championship Golden Ball: 2013
 CONCACAF Women's U-17 Championship Best XI: 2013
 Canadian Player of the Year: 2022, 2021
 Canadian U-20 Player of the Year: 2015, 2016, 2017
Canadian U-17 Player of the Year: 2014
FA Women's Super League Player of the Month: November 2021
First-team All-American: 2017, 2019
Third-team All-American: 2016

References

External links

Jessie Fleming profile at UCLA
Jessie Fleming profile at FIFA

1998 births
Living people
Soccer players from London, Ontario
Canadian women's soccer players
Canada women's international soccer players
2015 FIFA Women's World Cup players
Footballers at the 2015 Pan American Games
Women's association football midfielders
Footballers at the 2016 Summer Olympics
Olympic soccer players of Canada
Olympic bronze medalists for Canada
Olympic medalists in football
Medalists at the 2016 Summer Olympics
UCLA Bruins women's soccer players
2019 FIFA Women's World Cup players
Canadian expatriate sportspeople in England
Expatriate women's footballers in England
Pan American Games competitors for Canada
Footballers at the 2020 Summer Olympics
Medalists at the 2020 Summer Olympics
Olympic gold medalists for Canada
FIFA Century Club